The U.S. Immigration and Nationality Act may refer to one of several acts including:
 Immigration and Nationality Act of 1952
 Immigration and Nationality Act of 1965
 Immigration Act of 1990

See also
 List of United States immigration legislation
 Border Security, Economic Opportunity, and Immigration Modernization Act of 2013